The Big 12 Conference women's soccer tournament is the postseason women's soccer tournament for the Big 12 Conference. The seven-match single-elimination tournament consists of three rounds between eight teams based on seeding from regular season conference play. Former conference members Nebraska Cornhuskers and Texas A&M Aggies share the record for most tournament championships: 5. The most recent champions are TCU after winning the 2021 tournament. In 1996, the inaugural conference tournament was held at World Wide Technology Soccer Park in St. Louis. Blossom Athletic Center in San Antonio, Texas held the tournament from 1997 to 2012 and Swope Soccer Village in Kansas City held the tournament from 2013 to 2019.

Champions

By school
Source:

References

External links
 Official website

 
Recurring sporting events established in 1996
1996 establishments in the United States